The Master of Arts in Liberal Studies or Master of Liberal Arts (ALM, MALA, MLS, or MALS) is a graduate degree that aims to provide both depth and breadth of study in the liberal arts. It is by nature an interdisciplinary program, generally pulling together coursework from a number of disciplines such as behavioral sciences, humanities, natural sciences, and social sciences designed to train students to think critically and contextually about their own fields of discipline as well a diverse range of issues. Similar graduate degrees are known as Master of Liberal Arts (MLA or ALM), Master of Liberal Studies (MLS), Artium Liberalium Magister (ALM, or Art. Lib. Mgr.), Magister Artium Liberalium (Mgr. Art. Lib.), and Doctor of Liberal Studies (DLS). Characteristics that distinguish these degrees include curricular flexibility and interdisciplinary synthesis via a master's thesis or capstone project.

Like other master's degree programs, students generally enroll in a master's in liberal studies only after receiving a bachelor's degree.  , there were over 130 colleges and universities offering liberal arts master's programs. Admissions criteria vary by institution.

Postgraduate liberal studies originated at Wesleyan University in 1953. Administrators sought to 'break graduate education free' from what they perceived as 'the bonds of overspecialization' that were then prevalent at colleges and universities throughout the United States and Europe. Initially aimed at professors and teachers, postgraduate liberal studies quickly gained popularity and became a cause célèbre during the progressive education movements of the 1960s. Another early program began at Johns Hopkins University in 1962 and quickly gained national recognition. Then as now, Liberal Studies programs tend to draw courses and instructors from across a university's postgraduate curriculum. Students often devise unique courses of study to suit their individual interests, passion, and scholarly curiosity. Typically liberal arts graduate programs are designed to counter the trend in modern education toward specialization and toward a career focus, offering instead the opportunity to explore ideas, to pursue knowledge for the sake of knowledge, and learning for the joy of the intellectual challenge.

Graduate Liberal Studies Institutions
The Association of Graduate Liberal Studies Programs supports the work of the many member universities and colleges by holding a national conference each year and by publishing Confluence: The Journal of Graduate Liberal Studies, which features writing by faculty and students of the member institutions.

Institutional Members of the AGLSP
Arizona State University: Tempe, AZ
California State University Northridge: Northridge, CA
Clayton State University, Morrow, GA
Dallas Baptist University: Dallas, TX
Dartmouth College: Hanover, NH
DePaul University: Chicago, IL
Dominican University of California: San Rafael, CA
Duke University: Durham, NC
East Tennessee State University: Johnson City, TN
Fort Hays State University: Hays, KS
Georgetown University: Washington, DC
Harvard University: Cambridge, MA
Henderson State University: Arkadelphia, AR
Hollins University: Roanoke, VA
Indiana University Northwest: Gary, IN
Indiana University South Bend: South Bend, IN
Indiana University Southeast: New Albany, IN
Johns Hopkins University: Baltimore, MD
Lake Forest College: Lake Forest, IL
Louisiana State University Shreveport, LA
Loyola University in Maryland: Baltimore, MD
Marshall University Graduate College: South Charleston, WV
Midwestern State University: Wichita Falls, TX
Mount St. Mary's University: Los Angeles, CA
North Carolina State University: Raleigh, NC
Northwestern University: Evanston, IL
Oakland University: Rochester, MI 
Reed College: Portland, OR
Rice University: Houston, TX
Rollins College: Winter Park, FL
Rutgers University: Camden, NJ
San Diego State University: San Diego, CA
Simon Fraser University: Vancouver, BC
Southern Methodist University: Dallas, TX
Spring Hill College: Mobile, AL
St. John's College-Annapolis: Annapolis, MD
St. John's College-Santa Fe: Santa Fe, NM
St. Norbert College: De Pere, WI
Stanford University: Stanford, CA
SUNY Brockport: Brockport, NY
SUNY Empire State College: East Syracuse, NY
Temple University: Philadelphia, PA
Texas Christian University: Fort Worth, TX
Tulane University: New Orleans, LA
University of Central Oklahoma: Edmond, OK
University of Delaware: Newark, DE
University of Detroit Mercy: Detroit, MI
University of Houston – Clear Lake: Houston, TX
University of Memphis: Memphis, TN
University of Miami: Coral Gables, FL
University of North Carolina-Charlotte: Charlotte, NC
University of North Carolina-Greensboro: Greensboro, NC
University of North Carolina-Wilmington: Willmington, NC
University of Oklahoma: Norman, OK
University of Pennsylvania: Philadelphia, PA
University of Richmond: Richmond, VA
University of St. Thomas: Houston, TX
University of Toledo: Toledo, OH
University of Washington Tacoma: Tacoma, WA
Valparaiso University: Valparaiso, IN
Vanderbilt University: Nashville, TN
Villanova University: Villanova, PA
Wake Forest University: Winston-Salem, NC
Wesleyan University: Middletown, CT
Western New Mexico University, Silver City, NM
Winthrop University: Rock Hill, SC

In 2005, Georgetown University became the world's first university to offer a Doctor of Liberal Studies. The Doctorate in Liberal Studies is offered through The School of Continuing Studies and the Graduate School at Georgetown.  Along with Georgetown's DLS program, one graduate school, at Drew University offers a Doctor of Letters, the only such degree not offered in the honorary fashion in the U.S.  The other two North American programs, at Emory University in Atlanta, GA and Simon Fraser University: Vancouver, BC, are Doctor of Philosophy degrees in interdisciplinary studies.

References

Liberal Studies